This page records the details of the Japan women's national football team in 2018.

Results

Players statistics

External links
Japan Football Association

Japan women's national football team results
2018 in Japanese women's football
Japan